Platensina woodi is a species of tephritid or fruit flies in the genus Platensina of the family Tephritidae.

Distribution
Ethiopia, Tanzania, Malawi, Mozambique, Zimbabwe.

References

Tephritinae
Taxa named by Mario Bezzi
Insects described in 1924
Diptera of Africa